The Owl's Bend Site is a location in the Ozark National Scenic Riverways, at Owls Bend, Missouri in eastern Shannon County adjacent to the Current River.  It was placed on the National Register of Historic Places on March 22, 1988.

References

Archaeological sites on the National Register of Historic Places in Missouri
National Register of Historic Places in Shannon County, Missouri